The Hartwell Baronetcy, of Dale Hall in the County of Essex, is a title in the Baronetage of the United Kingdom. It was created on 26 October 1805 for Admiral Francis Hartwell.

Hartwell baronets, of Dale Hall (1805)
Sir Francis John Hartwell, 1st Baronet (1757–1831)
Sir Brodrick Hartwell, 2nd Baronet (1813–1888)
Sir Francis Houlton Hartwell, 3rd Baronet (1835–1900)
Sir Brodrick Cecil Denham Arkwright Hartwell, 4th Baronet (1876–1948)
Sir Brodrick William Charles Elwin Hartwell, 5th Baronet (1909–1993)
Sir (Francis) Anthony Charles Peter Hartwell, 6th Baronet (born 1940)

The heir apparent to the baronetcy is Timothy Peter Michael Charles Hartwell (born 1970), only son of the 6th Baronet.

Extended family
John Redmond Hartwell (1887–1970), son of Sydney Charles Elphinstone Hartwell, third son of the second Baronet, was a major general in the army.

Notes

Hartwell